Aldo Vladimiro Estrada Choque (born 11 January 1939) is a Peruvian lawyer and politician who is a former Congressman representing the constituency of Puno for the 2006–2011 term. He was previously congressman for the 1995–2000 term and a Deputy from 1980 to 1985 representing Puno. Estrada belongs to the Union for Peru party and is the leader of the Union for Peru.

Biography 
He was born in Juli, capital of the Province of Chucuito, department of Puno, on January 11, 1939 son of Héctor Estrada Serrano and Blanca Strada clash. He studied his primary and secondary studies in the hometown of him. The superiors held them at the Faculty of Law of the National University of Saint Anthony the Abbot in Cusco. He carried out his master's studies at the University of San Martín de Porres and Doctorate at the National University Federico Villarreal, both in the city of Lima. He also led specialization studies in criminal law compared to the Universities of Bloomington - Indiana of the United States of America and at the Autonomous University of Mexico.

During his student time he was vice president and president of the University Federation of Cusco. Then, as a lawyer, he was Dean of the Illustrious Cusco Bar Association for four periods and president of the Federation of Lawyers of Peru based in Lima for two years. He was also a university professor at the Faculties of Law of Universities: National University of Saint Anthony the Abbot in Cusco, National University of San Marcos, University of San Martín de Porres and the Academy of Magistracy.

External links

Official Congressional Site

Living people
Union for Peru politicians
National Front of Workers and Peasants politicians
Members of the Congress of the Republic of Peru
Members of the Chamber of Deputies of Peru
1939 births
People from Puno Region
20th-century Peruvian politicians
21st-century Peruvian politicians
University of San Martín de Porres alumni
National University of Saint Anthony the Abbot in Cuzco alumni
Federico Villarreal National University alumni